Dira Sugandi  or  DIRA (born July 29, 1979) is an Indonesian singer and actress.

Early life
She was born in Bandung, West Java on July 29, 1979 into a family with a strong singing tradition (both her mother and grandmother were singers). She began her singing career as a vocal performance major in the Music Department at Pelita Harapan, earning her bachelor's degree in 2006.

Career
DIRA is considered one of the well-established singers and actress in Indonesia. She is known for her powerful, soulful yet airy voice which compliments her style of singing.

Throughout her singing career she has shared the stage with some of the world's top acts such as Andrea Bocelli, David Foster, Jason Mraz, Diane Warren, and George Duke.

DIRA's debut album “Something About the Girl” was produced by Jean-Paul Maunick a.k.a. Bluey, leader of INCOGNITO a British Acid Jazz Band and was released in 2010 and distributed throughout UK, Japan, Europe, US and Indonesia. The album was nominated by UK Soultracks for Best Independent Album of The Year 2010 and Dira was also nominated for Best Female Vocalist 2010.

The album features 14 songs, primarily in English, with two cuts in Indonesian "Kucemburu" and "Kami Cinta Indonesia" (We love Indonesia) written by Harry Roesli.

In December 2010, she acted in the musical version of the film "Laskar Pelangi" which was shown at Taman Ismail Marzuki Fine Arts Center in Jakarta, sharing the role of the teacher, Muslimah, along with two other actresses, Lea Simanjuntak and Ekadeli.

On May 15, 2011, Dira Sugandi performed a duet with Italian tenor Andrea Bocelli during his first-ever concert in Indonesia, at the Ritz-Carlton Pacific Place in Jakarta.

Dira Sugandi performed at the Anugerah Musik Indonesia (AMI) Awards 2011, an Indonesian Music Award show on 6 July 2011 in Jakarta.

Album
 Something About the Girl (2010)
 Something About the Girl - Deluxe Version (2021)

Single
 Langit/Pelangi - Double Single (2017)
 Malaikat Kecilku - Single (2017)
 Seribu Tahun Lagi - Single (2021)
Back In Time - Single (2021)

Movie
 9 Summers 10 Autumns (2013)
 Selamat Pagi Malam / In The Absence of the Sun (2014)
 A World Without - Netflix (2021)

References

Living people
1979 births
English-language singers from Indonesia
Indonesian jazz musicians
Indonesian jazz singers
21st-century Indonesian women singers
Indonesian soul singers
Sundanese people